The Castle of Arnóia is a medieval castle in civil parish of Arnóia, municipality of Celorico de Basto, the district of Braga.

It is classified as a National Monument.

Castelo Arnoia
Arnoia